Black Wing Foundation was a video game developer located in Dnipro. In 2012, it partnered with Epic Games for use of Unreal Engine in their games.

Games
 2009 - Stalin vs. Martians, PC
 Q4 2013-Q1 2014 (Unreleased) - Scivelation, PC, Xbox 360, PlayStation 3
 Q4 2013-Q1 2014 - In Fear I Trust, PC
 Q2 2016 - Brothers: A Tale of Two Sons, iOS and Android port
 Q4 2017-Q3 2018 - Life Is Strange, iOS and Android port
 2018 Hello Neighbor, iOS and Android port

References

External links
 (closed)

Defunct video game companies of Ukraine
Video game companies established in 2006